Evgeny Sokolov (born 11 June 1984 in Moscow) is a Russian road bicycle racer who last rode for UCI ProTour team .

Palmares

2005
 3rd, Overall, Five Rings of Moscow
 3rd, Overall, Tour de Gironde
2006
  U23 Road Race Champion
 3rd, Overall, La Tropicale Amissa Bongo
 3rd, Overall, Circuit de Saône-et-Loire
 Winner Stage 4
 3rd, Overall, Bidasoa Itzulia
 Winner Stage 1
2007
 1st, Overall, Bordeaux-Saintes
 Winner Stage 1
 1st, Les Boucles du Sud Ardèche

External links

Russian male cyclists
1984 births
Living people
Cyclists from Moscow